Ptycheulimella is a genus of sea snails, marine gastropod mollusks in the family Pyramidellidae, the pyrams and their allies.

Description
The shell has an elongate-conic shape. The axial sculpture consists of obsolete ribs, frequently only shown in the early turns of the teleoconch. Spiral sculpture, if present, consists of microscopic striations only.

Species
Species within the genus Ptycheulimella include:
 Ptycheulimella eulimelloides (Nomura, 1936) 
 Ptycheulimella hemiplicata (Nomura, 1936) 
 Ptycheulimella misella (Yokoyama, 1922)
 Ptycheulimella rikuzenica (Nomura, 1936) 
 Ptycheulimella supramisella (Nomura, 1938) 
 Ptycheulimella syrnoliformis (Nomura, 1938) 
 Ptycheulimella yabei Nomura 1939

References

External links
 To World Register of Marine Species

Pyramidellidae